Seasons of the Black is the 23rd studio album by German heavy metal band Rage, released on 28 July 2017 through Nuclear Blast Records. Videos were made for the singles "Blackened Karma" and "Seasons of the Black". A bonus disc, Avenger Revisted, are re-recording of songs from Prayers of Steel, Rage's first album under the name "Avenger".

Track listing

Bonus CD - Avenger Revisited

Personnel

 Peter "Peavy" Wagner – vocals, bass
 Marcos Rodriguez - guitar, backing vocals
 Vassilios "Lucky" Maniatopoulos - drums, backing vocals

References 

2017 albums
Rage (German band) albums
Nuclear Blast albums